Leiston is an English town in the East Suffolk non-metropolitan district of Suffolk, near Saxmundham and Aldeburgh, about  from the North Sea coast,  north-east of Ipswich and  north-east of London. The town had a population of 5,508 at the 2011 Census.

History
The 14th-century remains of Leiston Abbey lie north-west of the town.

Leiston thrived in the late 19th and early 20th centuries as a manufacturing town, dominated by Richard Garrett & Sons, owners of Leiston Works, which boasted the world's first flow assembly line, for the manufacture of portable steam engines. The firm also made steam tractors and a huge variety of cast and machined metal products, including munitions during both world wars. The works closed in 1981 and the site was reused as a mixture of housing, flats and industrial sites. The Long Shop Museum, showing the history, vehicles and products of the works, remains as a heritage tourist attraction.

In 1927, A. S. Neill relocated Summerhill School from Lyme Regis to Leiston. This was the first major "free school" – referring to freedom in education. Children are not required to attend classes and discipline is meted by pupil self-government meetings. Summerhill has inspired a large "free school" movement and more recently, democratic schools in several countries. The school occupies the former mansion of Richard Garrett, owner of Leiston Works.

Famous American test pilot and fighter ace General Chuck Yeager (later, first to break the sound barrier) flew out of RAF Leiston. The Friends of Leiston Airfield hold a memorial service and flying display at the end of May each year, with veterans and their families attending.

Notable people
In birth order:
Ranulf de Glanvill (died 1190), Chief Justiciar of England, founded Leiston Abbey for White Canons in 1183.
Richard Garrett (1755–1839) founded the engineering company Richard Garrett and Sons in Leiston.
Edward Buckton Lamb (1806–1869), architect, designed St Margaret's Church in Leiston.
Newson Garrett (1812–1893), born in Leiston, built up the malting business whose premises were converted into the Snape Maltings concert hall.
A. S. Neill (1883–1973), Scottish educationalist, founded the progressive Summerhill School in 1924 and moved it to Leiston in 1927. 
M. E. Aldrich Rope (1891–1988), born and died in Leiston, was a stained-glass artist in the Arts and Crafts tradition.
Paxton Chadwick (1903–1961), artist and illustrator, taught at Summerhill and was Communist chair of Leiston Town Council.

Governance
There is an electoral ward named Leiston, with a population at the 2011 census of 6,360.

Economy and community
Since the closure of Garrett's, the town's economy has been dominated by two nuclear power stations on the coast at Sizewell: the now decommissioned Magnox reactors of Sizewell A and the more modern Pressurised Water Reactor of Sizewell B. A number of smaller companies operate from industrial areas within the town.

Leiston's High Street serves as the business and market hub of the surrounding agricultural district. The town's facilities include a post office, library, banks, pubs and a range of shops and other services.

Leiston Film Theatre, a half-timbered building with street front shops, is the oldest purpose-built cinema in Suffolk. The cinema is owned and run by Leiston-cum-Sizewell Town Council and backed by Leiston Film Theatre Support Club, which has raised money for stage refurbishment and enabled the cinema to install a digital 3D projection system.

The town has a traditional Anglican church, St Margaret's, with an ancient tower and an unusual 19th-century nave. There are Roman Catholic and Baptist churches on the edge of the town.

Sport and leisure
Leiston F.C. plays in the Bostik Premier Division and in November 2008 reached the first round of the FA Cup for the first time in its history.

Leiston also has a leisure centre, a skate park and several parks.

Leiston and Thorpeness Rugby Club was in existence in the late 1980s and early 1990s. It closed in 1995, but was revived in March 2010 as Aldeburgh and Thorpeness Rugby Club, with many of the previous club's members.

Transport
A railway branch spur from the Great Eastern line, known as the Aldeburgh branch line, went from Saxmundham to Aldeburgh, with intermediate stations at Leiston and Thorpeness. On 12 September 1966 British Rail withdrew all passenger services to Leiston and beyond. However, the line to Leiston remained active for the purpose of removing nuclear materials from Sizewell power station.

Leiston has direct bus services to Ipswich, Saxmundham, Aldeburgh, Thorpeness and Halesworth.

Education
Other than Summerhill School, Leiston also has conventional primary and secondary schools.

Leiston Primary School caters for pupils aged 5–11 and runs a nursery with 52 places.

Alde Valley Academy is a secondary school and sixth form with academy status, formerly known as Leiston Community High School, then as Alde Valley School from September 2012, after reorganisation involving the closure of Leiston Middle School and conversion from a 13–18 school to one taking pupils from the age of 11. The school received academy status in January 2015 and was renamed Alde Valley Academy.

In 2001 the school had become a Specialist Technology College, and in following years was named as one of the most improved schools in England. It was the lead school in the Schools Energy Network based at the Orbis Centre in Lowestoft and had strong links with the Sizewell nuclear power stations.

References

External links
The Leiston Long Shop Museum
Suffolk's oldest cinema
Visit Leiston
Leiston Abbey

 
Towns in Suffolk
Civil parishes in Suffolk
Suffolk Coastal